Epilepsy in animals is a group of neurological disorders characterized by seizures, caused by uncontrolled, abnormal bursts of electrical activity in the brain. They can start and stop very abruptly and last any amount of time from a few seconds to a few minutes. Canine epilepsy is often genetic but epilepsy in cats and other pets is rarer, likely because there is no hereditary component to epilepsy in these animals.

Characteristics 
Epilepsy is most commonly recognised by involuntary movements of the head and limbs, however other characteristics include salivation, lack of bodily functions and anxiety. Animals often lose consciousness and are not aware of their surroundings.

Handling seizures 
Watching an animal have a seizure can be quite frightening. There is not much that can be done during a seizure except to remain calm and not leave the animal alone. If your pet is having a seizure it is important to make sure they are lying down on the floor away from any water, stairs or other animals. When an animal has a seizure, do not try to grab their tongue or clear their mouth as there is a high chance you will be bitten; contrary to popular myth, neither humans nor animals can "swallow their tongue" during a seizure, so it is safest to stay well away from their mouth during one. Timing seizures is also crucial. Take notes of seizures - what time they occur, how often and any other specific information which can be passed onto the vet or emergency animal clinic. A general seizure log should include the following information: the day and time of the seizure, intensity of the seizure, changes to medications, therapeutic drug levels, and any potential triggers that may have caused the onset of the seizure. For easier pattern recognition, it is recommended that the seizure log be written in a linear format.

Dogs 

In dogs, epilepsy is often an inherited condition. The incidence of epilepsy/seizures in the general dog population is estimated to be between 0.5% and 5.7%. In certain breeds, such as the Belgian Shepherd, the incidence may be much higher.

Diagnosis 
There are three types of epilepsy in dogs: reactive, secondary, and primary.  Reactive epileptic seizures are caused by metabolic issues, such as low blood sugar or kidney or liver failure.  Epilepsy attributed to brain tumor, stroke or other trauma is known as secondary or symptomatic epilepsy.

There is no known cause for primary or idiopathic epilepsy, which is only diagnosed by eliminating other possible causes for the seizures.  Dogs with idiopathic epilepsy experience their first seizure between the ages of one and three.  However, the age at diagnosis is only one factor in diagnosing canine epilepsy, as one study found cause for seizures in one-third of dogs between the ages of one and three, indicating secondary or reactive rather than primary epilepsy.

A veterinarian's initial work-up for a dog presenting with a history of seizures may include a physical and neurological exam, a complete blood count, serum chemistry profile, urinalysis, bile tests, and thyroid function tests.  These tests verify seizures and may determine cause for reactive or secondary epilepsy. Veterinarians may also request that dog owners keep a "seizure log" documenting the timing, length, severity, and recovery of each seizure, as well as dietary or environmental changes.

Treatment 
Many antiepileptic drugs are used for the management of canine epilepsy. Oral phenobarbital, in particular, levetiracetam and imepitoin are considered to be the most effective antiepileptic drugs and usually used as ‘first line’ treatment. Other anti-epileptics such as zonisamide, primidone, gabapentin, pregabalin, sodium valproate, felbamate and topiramate may also be effective and used in various combinations. A crucial part of the treatment of pets with epilepsy is owner education to ensure compliance and successful management.

Cats 
Seizures in cats have various initiating factors. Cats can have reactive, primary (idiopathic) or secondary seizures. Idiopathic seizures are not as common in cats as in dogs however a recent study conducted showed that of 91 feline seizures, 25% were suspected to have had idiopathic epilepsy. In the same group of 91 cats, 50% were secondary seizures and 20% reactive.

Classifications 
Idiopathic epilepsy does not have a classification due to the fact there are no known causes of these seizures, however both reactive and symptomatic secondary epilepsy can be placed into classifications.

Cancer

Meningiomas, lymphomas and glial cell brain tumours are the most common cancers in cats and are all common causes of seizures.

Vascular disease 
Vascular disease refers to any condition that effects the flow of blood to the brain and can potentially result in seizure disorders. Common vascular diseases in cats include, feline ischemic encephalopathy, polycythemia and hypertension.

Inflammatory/infectious 
Any inflammatory or infectious disease that reaches the brain can result in inducing seizures. The most common inflammatory or infectious diseases which cause seizures in cats include, feline infectious peritonitis, Toxoplasmosis and Cryptococcus.

Reactive seizure disorders 
Many diseases that occur as a result from illness in parts of the body other than the brain can cause felines to have seizures, especially in older cats. Some of the common metabolic causes of seizures in felines include, hepatic encephalopathy, renal encephalopathy, hypoglycaemia and hypothyroidism.

See also
 Canine epileptoid cramping syndrome
 Epilepsy in gerbils

References

Dog diseases
Cat diseases
Animal diseases
Epilepsy
Animal nervous system